The Queensland Heritage Register is a heritage register, a statutory list of places in Queensland, Australia that are protected by Queensland legislation, the Queensland Heritage Act 1992. It is maintained by the Queensland Heritage Council. As at 5 April 2020 there are 1790 places on the Queensland Heritage Register, including the Story Bridge in Brisbane and the Ross River Meatworks Chimney in Townsville.

Criteria

For a place to be entered in the register, it must be nominated and then go through a process of assessment. There are three categories for inclusion: 
 State Heritage Place (the most common type of entry), e.g. the Charters Towers Courthouse
 Archaeological Place, e.g. the First Brisbane Burial Ground in the vicinity of Skew Street, Brisbane

Criteria for inclusion as a State Heritage Place

For inclusion as a State Heritage Place on the Queensland Heritage Register, the place must satisfy one of the following criteria:
 it shows evolutions or patterns of the history of Queensland
 it has rare, uncommon or endangered aspects of the cultural heritage of Queensland
 it contributes to an understanding of the history of Queensland
 it is a good example of a particular type of cultural place
 it is important for its aesthetics
 it shows a high standard of creative or technical achievement in its time period
 it is important to a particular community or cultural group for social, cultural or spiritual reasons
 it is associated with the life or work of important people, groups or organisations in the history of Queensland

Criteria for inclusion as an Archaeological Place
For inclusion as an Archaeological Place on the Queensland Heritage Register, the place must have the potential to contain an archaeological artefact that might yield information about the history of Queensland. If a place is already listed as a State Heritage Place, it cannot also be separately listed as an Archaeological Place.

Protected Areas

A Protected Area must be declared by regulation; there is no explicit criteria listed in the legislation, other than it be a place of great significance to cultural heritage. Entry to Protected Areas is restricted with a system of permits, affording a high level of protection.

Format of the Register

An entry in the Queensland Heritage Register must include:
 location information
 the history of the place 
 a description of the place 
 if it is subject to a heritage agreement
 for State Heritage Places, how it meets the criteria for State Heritage Places
 for Archaeological Places, how it meets the criteria for Archaeological Places
 for Protected Areas, a statement of the significance of the cultural heritage that warrants the protection

Other heritage registers

Places may also be entered in other lists such as the Commonwealth National Heritage List which is maintained by the Australian Heritage Council.

Under Section 113 of the Queensland Heritage Act 1992, all local government authorities in Queensland must maintain a local heritage register; the Brisbane Heritage Register is an example of a local government heritage register in Queensland.

See also

Australian Heritage Database

References

External links

 Queensland Heritage Act 1992
 Queensland Heritage Register (searchable)

 
Heritage registers in Australia
Historical sites in Queensland
Heritage
Heritage